Verton is a commune in the Pas-de-Calais department in the Hauts-de-France region of France.

Geography
Verton is located 6 miles (9 km) southwest of Montreuil-sur-Mer at the D143 and D303 road junction, and 3 miles (5 km) from the coast, near the estuary of the Authie.

Population

Places of interest
 The château, dating from the fifteenth century
 The watermill
 The  church of St. Michel, dating from the fourteenth century.

See also
Communes of the Pas-de-Calais department

References

Communes of Pas-de-Calais